Kakamega is a town in western Kenya lying about 30 km north of the Equator. It is the headquarters of Kakamega County that has a population of 1,867,579  (2019 census).

Kakamega is 52 km north of Kisumu, the tenth largest city in Kenya and considered the heart of Luhya land. The average elevation of Kakamega is 1,535 metres.

The county has 12 constituencies in total, namely Butere, Mumias East,Mumias West, Matungu, Khwisero, Shinyalu, Lurambi, ikolomani, Lugari, Malava, Navakholo and Likuyani.

Kakamega was so named because the word "kakamega" translates roughly to "pinch" in Luhya, which was used to describe how European colonists would eat the staple food, ugali.

Naming
It is often told that Kakamega derives its modern name from the local dialect. The story goes that when European settlers first visited the area now known as Kakamega and were offered maize meal, the local staple food called Obusuma, they tried to emulate the eating style for which the tribe was famous. To the hosts though, the visitors were more like ‘pinching’ the Obusuma. The resulting administrative area was named "Kakamega", which roughly translates to ‘pinch.’ Actually the name is from the former Nandi people who inhabited the area prior to the Luhya. There is a tale that the town was originally inhabited by the Nandi, and when the building started swelling, the Nandi called the area “Kokomego”  which loosely translate into there is a lot of buildings, in the Nandi dialect. The new inhabitants took the name and coined it into Kakamega.

Economics 

The local inhabitants are mostly the Luhya tribe, whose economic activity is mainly cash and food crop farming.

Kakamega serves as the headquarters of Mumias Sugar, previously Kenya's largest sugar processing company located in the town of Mumias.

Kakamega was the scene of the Kakamega gold rush in the early 1930s, fueled partly by the reports of the geologist Albert Ernest Kitson.

Masinde Muliro University of Science and Technology is a new institution of higher learning created by an act of parliament in December 2006 which is in the heart of Kakamega town on the Kakamega-Webuye road. It is expected to spur growth in this capital of Western Province.

Kakamega Forest is the main tourist destination in the area. Another attraction used to be the Crying Stone of Ilesi (Ikhongo Murwi) located along the Kisumu-Kakamega highway. It is a 40 metre high rock dome resembling a human figure whose "eyes" used to drop water. There is a myth about this rock with natives who believe that it is an image of a jilted woman who is crying due to being forced out of her matrimonial home and denied access to her children. A hearsay in earlier years goes that the Isukha Sub-tribe had wars with Nandi warriors and in most cases they defeated them. The Nandis believed they were defeated by Isukhas due to some super powers the rock had. The Nandis tried to pull the rock down but they failed and instead they lost more than 100 of their worriers in the battle field. Currently, the tourist attraction site is shaded from roadside view by planted eucalyptus trees which have used up the rock's water and subsequently caused the "Crying Stone" to dry up. This effect is due to the climate change that is being experienced globally. The area used to receive heavy rainfalls in the years 1990s backwards

Administration 

In 2013, Wycliffe Oparanya was elected as the first Governor of Kakamega County, and he retained the seat in the 2017 general elections. Kakamega forms a municipality with ten wards (Amalemba, Bukhulunya, Central, Mahiakalo, Maraba, Matende, Milimani, Musaa, Shibiriri and Sichilayi). All of them belong to Lurambi Constituency, which has a total of fifteen wards. The remaining five are located within Kakamega municipal Council, the rural council of Kakamega District.

Rainforest

Kakamega area receives a very high amount of annual precipitation and contains Kakamega Forest, a preserve which is a remnant of a rainforest that stretched west through Uganda.

As a rainforest, the canopy of the trees has grown into a thin mesh of interlocking top branches that block most sunlight from reaching the ground below, resulting in less vegetation at the ground level.  With few bushes along the darkened forest floor, the main obstacle is ancient fallen tree trunks blocking the paths between the standing trees. The German funded project BIOTA East is working in the forest since 2001, whereby firstly forest inventories for all sorts of life forms were performed and the aim is to find strategies for a sustainable use of the forest.

More than 400 species of birds have been found in the Kakamega rainforest. The many song birds fill the air with various birdcalls.

Kakamega is also home to Africa's largest and most aggressive cobra, the Kakamega forest cobra. Reputed by locals to spend a lot of time in the trees, stories abound of fearsome attacks on unsuspecting passers-by. Other snakes in the area include the forest adder, black mamba, and the green mamba.

Education
Tertiary Education

Kakamega is home to Masinde Muliro University of Science and Technology, located along Kakamega - Webuye road. This campus offers courses in Engineering, Computer Science, Education, Disaster Management, Journalism and Mass Communication, Science, Nursing, Criminology subjects. The Shamberere Technical Training Institute is also local.

Primary and Secondary education

Majority of primary and secondary schools  in Kakamega are government owned. Kakamega primary is the major primary school and is located in the town's centre. Private schools renowned nationally located in the town include: Kakamega Hill School and St Joseph primary school.

The town also hosts one national secondary school, Kakamega High School and many other secondary schools.

Library services

The town hosts one library set up by the Kenya National Library Service.

References

 
Kakamega County
Populated places in Western Province (Kenya)
County capitals in Kenya